Huggle was a location-based social application which connected users based on commonality of places they frequent. The app was developed through a partnership with entrepreneur Andrey Andreev. Following a soft launch in 2015, the app was officially launched in July 2016.

History 

Founders Stina Sanders and Valerie Stark met after Stark moved from Moscow to London and was using Instagram geolocation data to try and meet people who hung out at the same places she did. They decided to create an app inspired by how they met. Sanders and Stark took the idea to Andrey Andreev, the tech entrepreneur that backed Bumble, a feminist dating app, and founded dating app Badoo. The app took six months to build and had a soft launch in 2015. The app officially launched in July 2016 and was available globally the following October. The app was available for iOS, Android, and Windows Phone at its release. An updated version was released June 2017. By September 2017, over 45 million locations had been logged on the app.

A survey of 1,500 people conducted by Huggle in 2016 showed that dating apps that match people solely on appearance have a negative impact on people's self-esteem. 62 percent of those surveyed reported that dating apps make them feel self-conscious or depressed about their appearance and over 80 percent of the women surveyed admitted to editing photographs they have uploaded.

In February 2018, Huggle turned off its dating mode for 24 hours in an attempt to combat the pressure to find a date for Valentine's Day.

In March 2018, it was announced that Badoo had acquired Huggle as a subsidiary.

Operation 
The app was originally designed as a way to make friends by connecting with people who share mutual interests, though a dating element was added in response to users looking for romantic matches.

To verify a profile, users must take multiple selfies which are then approved by a team of 5,000 moderators. The actual profile is generated with information from other social media sites including Facebook, Foursquare, and Instagram. The user chooses whether they are looking for a date or a friend as well as ideal age range and how many places their matches must have in contact before they can contact the user.

When two users check in to the same place, they can view each other's profiles. The app automatically checks a user in at locations they visit and adds the location to their list of places. Users can then match with other people who visit that location.

Huggle includes a "visitors" feature that allows users to see people who view their profile.

Safety 
The first safety feature users encounter on Huggle is a one-minute photo verification through which Huggle asks users to take selfies by copying different gestures on the screen, which are first compared to uploaded pictures using 160 points on the face, then verified and approved by the moderators to filter fake profiles. Users can also be verified by their phone number, Gmail account, Instagram, Twitter and LinkedIn. Huggle uses hyperlocal technology to avoid fake check-ins. To check-in at a certain location, users have to be physically present at the place.  A user's list of favorite places is never shared. A person's location is only visible when both users go to the same place. Users can decide how many places they want to have in common with other users to enable them to message.

See also 
 Comparison of online dating services

References

External links 
 

Geosocial networking
Mobile social software
2016 software
Computer-related introductions in 2016
Online dating applications